The American band Faith No More has had nearly fifteen known band members, many for such a short period of time they were not documented, including: five vocalists, including Mike Morris; seven guitarists, also including Mike Morris; as well as two keyboardists; one drummer; and one bassist.

The band, consisting of Mike Morris, Billy Gould, Wade Worthington, and Mike Bordin, first formed in 1979 under the name Faith No Man, recording just one release. Wade left shortly afterward and was replaced by Roddy Bottum. In 1982 the entire band, minus Mike Morris, quit to form Faith No More. During this time they went through the majority of their long list of vocalists and guitarists, Courtney Love being the third and longest-standing vocalist at the time. They then settled on Chuck Mosley and Jim Martin, with whom they recorded and released their first two studio albums, We Care a Lot and Introduce Yourself. After the tour for Introduce Yourself the band fired Mosley and hired Mike Patton from the experimental band Mr. Bungle. This was Faith No More's longest-standing lineup and featured the most releases, including the studio albums The Real Thing and Angel Dust. Following the departure of Jim Martin in late 1993 the band went without a guitarist until starting the writing of the follow-up to Angel Dust, King for a Day... Fool for a Lifetime, for which they hired Trey Spruance, also of Mr. Bungle. Spruance left before the tour and was replaced by Dean Menta. Menta was then replaced by Jon Hudson before the recording of the band's final album, Album of the Year. Faith No More split up in 1998.

On February 24, 2009, Faith No More announced they would be re-forming for a European tour that began in June in Brixton Academy, London and then Download festival in Donington Park, the UK's biggest rock festival. Since their reformation, the lineup has been identical to the final lineup prior to the band's 1998 breakup.

Members

Current members

Former members

Timeline

References

 
Faith No More
Articles which contain graphical timelines